Trypsin-1, also known as cationic trypsinogen, is a protein that in humans is encoded by the PRSS1 gene.  Trypsin-1 is the main isoform of trypsinogen secreted by pancreas, the others are trypsin-2 (anionic trypsinogen), and trypsin-3 (meso-trypsinogen).

Function 

This gene encodes a trypsinogen, which is a member of the trypsin family of serine proteases. This enzyme is secreted by the pancreas and cleaved to its active form in the small intestine. It is active on peptide linkages involving the carboxyl group of lysine or arginine. Mutations in this gene are associated with hereditary pancreatitis. This gene and several other trypsinogen genes are localized to the T cell receptor beta locus on chromosome 7.

Clinical significance 

Its malfunction acts in an autosomal dominant manner to cause pancreatitis.  Many mutations that can lead to pancreatitis have been found. An example is a mutation at Arg 117. Arg 117 is a trypsin-sensitive site which can be cleaved by another trypsin and becomes inactivated.  This site may be a fail-safe mechanism by which trypsin, when activated within the pancreas, may become inactivated.  Mutation at this cleavage site would result in a loss of control and permit autodigestion, causing pancreatitis.

See also
Trypsin

References

Further reading

External links
  GeneReviews/NCBI/NIH/UW entry on PRSS1-Related Hereditary Pancreatitis
 

EC 3.4.21